Henry Quick (1792–1857) was an English poet who wrote about rural life in Cornwall.

Quick was born on 4 December 1792 at Zennor in Cornwall to Henry Quick and Margery George. His parents earned a meagre income from spinning and farming a small leasehold. As a young man, Quick began composing 'rugged verses for the countryside'. He was soon earning money by selling popular journals that he bought each month in Penzance.

From 1830 until his death in 1857, Quick wrote poems about local calamities and crimes, usually closing each poem with a religious exhortation. He printed most of his meditations as Broadside (printing)|broadsides.

In 1836 Quick wrote his Life and Progress in eighty-nine verses. In 1838, he published verses on the new Queen Victoria in A new Copy, &c., on the Glorious Coronation of Queen Victoria.  In 1848, he wrote about the Great Famine in Ireland in A new Copy of Verses on the Scarcity of the Present Season and Dreadful Famine in Ireland (1848).

Quick died at Mill Hill Down, Zennor, on 9 October 1857.

References

Attribution

Other sources
 Peter A.S. Pool The Life and Progress of Henry Quick of Zennor, 1994

1792 births
1857 deaths
People from Zennor
Poets from Cornwall
19th-century English poets
19th-century British male writers